Fireflies is a 2014 Bollywood drama film directed and produced by Sabal Singh Shekhawat. The film has an ensemble cast, which includes Rahul Khanna, Arjun Mathur, Shivani Ghai, Monica Dogra and Aadya Bedi.

Plot summary

Cast 
 Rahul Khanna as Shiv
 Arjun Mathur as Rana Rathore
 Shivani Ghai as Sharmila
 Monica Dogra as Michelle
 Aadya Bedi as Maya
 Arjun Deswal as Young Shiv
 Kunaal Kyhaan as Young Shiv

Critical response
NDTV rated the film 3.5 out of 5 stars, and said "Fireflies is an imperfect film about flawed characters who disguise their spiritual ennui in tailored postures of sophistication. It's not a great film. But it's sincere and a largely well-crafted piece of cinema about fractured lives frozen in compromised relationships". Indian Express rated the film 1.5 out of 5 stars. Sweta Kaushal of Hindustan Times gave the film 1.5 out of 5 stars taking on originality, said that "The well-meaning plot of Fireflies is totally wasted for a singular lack of imagination and the over-dependence on stereotypes. Skip this one, unless you are looking for a depressing movie that only confirms to all norms of cliches in the name of an Indie film". Renuka Vyavahare of The Times of India gave the film 2.1 out of 5 stars.

References

External links 
 
 

2014 films
Indian drama films
2010s Hindi-language films
2014 drama films
Hindi-language drama films